Joyce Caroline Clague MBE (née Mercy; born 22 July 1938) is an Australian political activist and Yaegl elder. Her activism centers on social change for Indigenous Australians. She was influential in instigating the 1967 Constitutional Referendum and in the 1996 native title claim, known as Yaegl #1, which was settled in 2015.

Early years
Joyce Caroline Mercy was born on 22 July 1938 in the New South Wales town of Maclean, one of 15 children.  Although Aboriginal children attending mission schools were strongly discouraged from speaking their mother tongues, Clague learned the Yaegl language to communicate with her grandparents and maintain a strong connection to her culture. 

As a teenager, she studied nursing in Sydney.

Career and activism
Clague met and became friends with leading members of the Aboriginal-Australian Fellowship and became a member of the Aborigines Progressive Association. In 1960, she attended the third Federal Council for Aboriginal Advancement conference at Newport, Sydney. She found encouragement in a visiting activist, Jack Horner.

She was influential in instigating the 1967 Constitutional Referendum. Following the 1967 referendum, she worked with musician Jimmy Little on a campaign to get Indigenous Australians on the electoral roll. She also appeared in the film about the 1967 referendum, Vote Yes for Aborigines.

In 1968, she stood for the Legislative Council of the Northern Territory, with her independent campaign encouraging the enrolment of 6500 Aboriginal people. She convened the Federation Council for Advancement of Aborigines (FCAATSI) in 1969. She was also appointed a representative of the World Churches Commission to Combat Racism. She was elected as Northern Territory state secretary at the 1972 FCAATSI conference. She also worked in the Office of the New South Wales Ombudsman as an assistant investigation officer. She was a founding member of and served two terms as the New South Wales Women's Advisory Council to the Premier.

In 1977, she was awarded the Member of the Order of the British Empire. Her father encouraged her to accept the honor on behalf of Aboriginal people. She refers to the MBE as More Black than Ever.

In the 1980s, she stood for pre-selection for Australian Labor Party seats in both houses of the Parliament of New South Wales. She was also a member of the Australian Republic Movement. Beginning in 1987, she was treasurer and member of the Metropolitan Land Council.

The Nungera Museum in Maclean was largely her initiative. After ending her involvement with the project, the museum ultimately failed.

In 1986, Clague was the first Aboriginal person to become a trustee on the Australian Museum Trust.

Native title claim
In November 1996, she and Della Walker lodged a native title claim, known as Yaegl #1, that encompasses a large stretch of the Clarence River and its tributaries, on behalf of the Yaegl people. This was successfully settled at a Federal Court of Australia consent determination hearing in 2015, ending what had been the oldest legal matter before the court.

Personal life
The 2007 documentary When Colin Met Joyce, written and produced by Pauline Clague, the third of her four daughters, concerns Clague's 40-year relationship with her husband Colin, an Anglo-Australian whose ancestors came from the Isle of Mann.

Works
 
 
 Clague, Joyce, 'Staying to the end', in Scutt, Jocelynne A. (ed.), Glorious age : growing older gloriously, Artemis, Melbourne, 1993.

References

1938 births
Living people
Australian indigenous rights activists
Women human rights activists
Bundjalung people
People from the Northern Rivers
Australian women activists
Australian Members of the Order of the British Empire